The Infinite Moment is a science fiction short story collection by British writer John Wyndham, published in Ballantine Books in 1961.

Contents
The collection contains:

 "Consider Her Ways"
 "Odd"
 "How Do I Do"
 "Stitch In Time"
 "Random Quest"
 "Time Out"

References 

1961 short story collections
Short story collections by John Wyndham
Ballantine Books books